Procryptocerus is a Neotropical genus of gliding ants, with the ability to "parachute" by steering their fall if they drop off of the tree they're on.

Distribution
Procryptocerus inhabits rainforests from the Isthmus of Tehuantepec in Mexico to northern Argentina. Due to their cryptic habits, living inside twigs, these ants are rarely collected. At present, most species are known from Central America, Colombia and Brazil.

Taxonomy
The genus was created by Emery (1887) to include species of Neotropical ants that were considered similar to those of the Paleotropical genus Cataulacus.

Procryptocerus has been the object of two revisionary studies. Kempf (1951) revised the entire genus and Longino and Snelling (2002) the Central American species. Kempf (1951) recognized 28 species, and 8 subspecies, while for Central America Longino and Snelling (2002) recognized 14 species, described four new species, synonymized two species, and elevated two subspecies to species level. Currently, 45 species are included in the genus.

Description
The genus is characterized by the protrusion of the clypeus forming a broad nasus and antennal scrobes over the eyes. The toruli are located right posterior to the flanks of the nasus opposite to each other. The vertex is deflexed posteriorly in most species. Procryptocerus ants possess notoriously variable morphology. Different characters, such as propodeal spine length, form of the clypeus, type of sculpture, and other such characters vary remarkably, sometimes even within the same species. Knowledge of morphology and anatomy is incomplete for all species.

Adult workers are mostly black in color, body variously sculptured and monomorphic, ranging from 3.5–8.5 mm. Although similar to workers, gyne are larger (3.7–9.5 mm) with thoracic sclerites corresponding to alates in other apocritans. Males are longer and more slender than gynes, ranging from 4.8 mm to 9.9 mm in length.

Species

Procryptocerus adlerzi (Mayr, 1887)
Procryptocerus attenuatus (Smith, 1876)
Procryptocerus balzani Emery, 1894
Procryptocerus batesi Forel, 1899
Procryptocerus belti Forel, 1899
Procryptocerus carbonarius (Mayr, 1870)
Procryptocerus clathratus Emery, 1896
Procryptocerus convergens (Mayr, 1887)
Procryptocerus convexus Forel, 1904
Procryptocerus coriarius (Mayr, 1870)
Procryptocerus curvistriatus Kempf, 1949
Procryptocerus eladio Longino & Snelling, 2002
Procryptocerus elegans Santschi, 1921
Procryptocerus ferreri Forel, 1912
Procryptocerus gibbosus Kempf, 1949
Procryptocerus goeldii Forel, 1899
Procryptocerus gracilis (Smith, 1858)
Procryptocerus hirsutus Emery, 1896
Procryptocerus hylaeus Kempf, 1951
Procryptocerus impressus Forel, 1899
Procryptocerus kempfi Longino & Snelling, 2002
Procryptocerus lenkoi Kempf, 1969
Procryptocerus lepidus Forel, 1908
Procryptocerus marginatus Borgmeier, 1948
Procryptocerus mayri Forel, 1899
Procryptocerus montanus Kempf, 1957
Procryptocerus nalini Longino & Snelling, 2002
Procryptocerus paleatus Emery, 1896
Procryptocerus petiolatus (Smith, 1853)
Procryptocerus pictipes Emery, 1896
Procryptocerus regularis Emery, 1888
Procryptocerus rudis (Mayr, 1870)
Procryptocerus sampaioi Forel, 1912
Procryptocerus scabriusculus Forel, 1899
Procryptocerus schmalzi Emery, 1894
Procryptocerus schmitti Forel, 1901
Procryptocerus seabrai Kempf, 1964
Procryptocerus spiniperdus Forel, 1899
Procryptocerus spinosus (Smith, 1859)
Procryptocerus striatus (Smith, 1860)
Procryptocerus subpilosus (Smith, 1860)
Procryptocerus sulcatus Emery, 1894
Procryptocerus tortuguero Longino & Snelling, 2002
Procryptocerus victoris Kempf, 1960
Procryptocerus virgatus Kempf, 1964

References

Longino JT, Snelling RR. (2002) "A Taxonomic revision of the Procryptocerus (Hymenoptera: Formicidae) of Central America." Contributions in Science, Number 495. Natural History Museum, Los Angeles.

External links

Myrmicinae
Ant genera
Hymenoptera of North America
Hymenoptera of South America